Bostanlı can refer to:

 Bostanlı, Havsa
 Bostanlı, Kahta
 Bostanlı, Kızılırmak
 Bostanlı İskele (Tram İzmir)
 Bostanlı Open-air Archaeological Museum